The Fish Haven Dolomite is an Ordovician period geologic formation in southern Idaho, northeastern Nevada, and northwestern Utah.

Geology
It was named for Fish Haven Creek, in the Bear River Range near the Utah-Idaho state line. Other locations it is found in include the Schell Creek Range, Goshute Mountains, Deep Creek Range, Pilot Range, and Toana John Mountains.

The Dolomite formation overlies the  Eureka Quartzite formation, and underlies the Laketown Dolomite formation.

Fossils
The formation preserves fossils dating back to the Ordovician period of the Paleozoic Era.

See also

 List of fossiliferous stratigraphic units in Idaho
 List of fossiliferous stratigraphic units in Nevada
 List of fossiliferous stratigraphic units in Utah

References

Ordovician United States
Dolomite formations
Ordovician Idaho
Ordovician geology of Nevada
Ordovician geology of Utah
Ordovician System of North America
Geologic formations of Nevada
Ordovician southern paleotropical deposits